Stargazing Live is a British live television programme on astronomy that was broadcast yearly on BBC Two over three nights every winter from 2011 to 2017. The series was primarily presented by scientist Brian Cox and comedian and amateur astronomer Dara Ó Briain with support from TV presenter and biochemist Liz Bonnin and astronomer Mark Thompson. For the first six series, the show was broadcast from Jodrell Bank Observatory in Cheshire, and featured live links from scientific facilities in locations such as Hawaii, South Africa, and Norway. The seventh series in 2017 was broadcast from Siding Spring Observatory in Australia, and a special episode filmed at Kennedy Space Center was broadcast in July 2019 to celebrate the 50th anniversary of the Apollo 11 mission.

Overview 

The first series was scheduled to coincide with the partial Solar eclipse of 4 January 2011, a conjunction of Jupiter and Uranus, and the Quadrantid meteor shower. It also featured Jonathan Ross learning how to spot planets, and a discussion with the International Space Station. Newly qualified British ESA astronaut Tim Peake appeared as a guest.

Scientific advisors for the first series included Dan Hillier, manager of the Royal Observatory, Edinburgh visitor centre.

To coincide with each series of the show, hundreds of Stargazing Live events were run across the UK, including star parties and 'sidewalk astronomy' sessions. Many of these events were organised by local astronomy societies and universities.

The show returned for a second series on 16–18 January 2012. The first episode had a theme about the moon, including a live interview with 'the last man on the moon', Apollo 17 astronaut Eugene Cernan. The second episode had a focus on black holes, and the third on the possible existence of extra-terrestrial life. Each episode included different guests, such as impressionist and amateur astronomer, Jon Culshaw on the second night. The final episode also included a feature titled the "Great Big Dulverton Switch Off" where every light in the town of Dulverton, Somerset was switched off live on TV to highlight the issue of light pollution. Each episode of the series was immediately followed by Back to Earth, an additional half-hour discussion of the main show.

The second series was a co-production with the Open University, with OU science consultants Dr Andrew Norton, Dr Dave Rothery and Dr Stephen Serjeant.

During the 2012 series, viewers were encouraged to help locate possible exoplanets, planets orbiting stars outside the Solar System, by volunteering some time on the Planet Hunters online citizen science project. This led to the discovery of a new Neptune-sized exoplanet by two amateur astronomers, one in Peterborough, England, to be named Threapleton Holmes B.

The third series returned with another three episodes. As with the last series, a "Back to Earth" chat was held after each episode. A citizen science project was again featured, this time asking viewers to help in identifying areas of interest in aerial photographs of the surface of Mars. Another feature which ran across the three nights involved the construction of a modern version of William Herschel's 20-foot telescope at the University of Derby.

The fourth series appeared in January 2014, with the citizen science project asking viewers to look for evidence of gravitational lensing in deep space photographs, which resulted in the discovery of dozens of previously unknown galaxies. The series also featured live broadcasts from Norway with the aim of capturing the aurora borealis on camera; although the show's publicity emphasised that the unpredictable nature of the aurora meant this attempt could easily fail, an unexpectedly large coronal mass ejection that week resulted in strong auroral activity, with live footage of the phenomenon being captured on all three nights.

Stargazing Live returned in 2015 but it was not held in the usual January slot which has been the usual month for all previous events; it was held on 18 to 20 March instead to coincide with next total solar eclipse which took place on 20 March 2015.

On 6 November 2015, the BBC confirmed two special episodes of Stargazing Live which aired on 15 December 2015, with Dara Ó Briain and Professor Brian Cox, covering the launch of Expedition 46 to the International Space Station with British astronaut Tim Peake aboard. The first special entitled Blast Off Live: A Stargazing Special covered the launch of Expedition 46 at 11:05 am. A latter programme Stargazing Live Special: Tim Peake Docking covered the missions' docking with the ISS that same evening.

Simultaneously the BBC confirmed a sixth series of Stargazing Live, which began in January 2016, featuring coverage of Tim Peake aboard the International Space Station.

The seventh series of Stargazing Live was broadcast from Australia on 18–20 March 2017, taking advantage of the Equinox to match the last three-quarters of an hour of darkness in Australia or an 8:00pm broadcast time in the UK.

After a two-year hiatus, Stargazing Live returns for a one-off live special on BBC Two to air on Monday 15 July 2019 from 9.00pm – 10.30pm. To celebrate the 50th anniversary of the Apollo 11 moon landing, Dara O'Briain and Professor Brian Cox travelled to Cape Canaveral, Florida where the historic Apollo 11 mission began. They heard first hand from Apollo 16 astronaut Charlie Duke on what it was like to guide Neil Armstrong and Buzz Aldrin to the surface of the Moon in the Lunar Lander, and how Duke followed in their footsteps three years later. They also look at the most exciting new developments and, with privileged access, they broadcast from the top of launch tower that is being prepared for crewed missions and from the assembly line of a spacecraft factory. They are joined by astrophysicist and medic Dr Kevin Fong and mathematician Dr Hannah Fry, who explored the latest developments in human space flight – from cutting-edge spacewalk technology to a future Mars buggy.

Stargazing Live in Australia
In 2017, following on from the seventh series of BBC Stargazing Live in Australia, ABC TV broadcast an Australia-focused series on 4–6 April 2017, co-anchored by Brian Cox and Australian television presenter Julia Zemiro and featuring journalist Kumi Taguchi. The BBC Australian program was similar to the UK format, as the hosts were joined by professional astrophysicists such as Lisa Harvey-Smith and Chris Lintott, amateur astronomer Greg Quicke, and Indigenous Australian Michael Anderson who shared the astronomical knowledge of Indigenous Australians and their connection with the cosmos.

A second Australian series aired on 22–24 May 2018. It featured a Guinness World Record for the most people simultaneously observing an object in the night sky, when approximately 40,000 registered citizens watched the moon for 10 minutes on 23 May.

Episodes

Series 1 (2011)

Series 2 (2012)
Each episode of this series was immediately followed by Stargazing Live: Back to Earth, in which Brian, Dara and their guests discuss the subjects raised in the main show.

Series 3 (2013)
As with Series 2, each episode was followed by Stargazing Live: Back to Earth.

Series 4 (2014)
As with Series 2 and 3, each episode was followed by Stargazing Live: Back to Earth.

Series 5 (2015)
Stargazing Live 2015 was broadcast on 18, 19 and 20 March to coincide with the Solar eclipse of Friday 20 March 2015 which – cloud permitting – was visible across much of Britain. The eclipse is comparable with the 1999 Solar Eclipse in the northernmost parts of Britain and will be the last total solar eclipse visible in Europe until 12 August 2026.

Series 6 (2016)
A 6th series of Stargazing Live aired on 12–14 January 2016. Only one Back to Earth episode aired; it was broadcast following the first episode.

Series 7 (2017)
Series 7 of Stargazing Live aired on 28–30 March 2017. The series focused on stargazing and astronomy in Australia, broadcast live from the Siding Spring Observatory. For the first time, the series was followed by the first series of the Australian version of the show from 4–6 April 2017 on ABC.

Specials
Two special episodes of Stargazing Live aired on 15 December 2015 to cover the launch of Tim Peake into space as part of Expedition 46 to the International Space Station. A special aired on 15 January 2016 to celebrate Peake taking his first spacewalk.

References

External links 

BBC Television shows
Astronomy education television series
2011 British television series debuts
2019 British television series endings